This is a list of the U.S. Billboard magazine Mainstream Top 40 number-one songs of 2015.

During 2015, a total of 19 singles hit number-one on the charts.

Chart history

See also
2015 in American music

References

External links
Current Billboard Pop Songs chart

Billboard charts
Mainstream Top 40 2015
United States Mainstream Top 40